Geoffrey Allen may refer to:

 Sir Geoffrey Allen (chemist) (born 1928), British chemist and academic
 G. Freeman Allen, author specialising in railways
 Geoffrey Allen (bishop) (1902–1982), bishop of Derby, 1959–1969
 Geoffrey Allen (priest) (born 1939), Archdeacon of North West Europe
 Geoff Allen (footballer) (born 1946), English footballer for Newcastle United

See also
Jeffrey Allen (disambiguation)